Vostok 6 (Orient 6 or East 6) was the first human spaceflight to carry a woman, cosmonaut Valentina Tereshkova, into space.

Mission
The spacecraft was launched on 16 June 1963. While Vostok 5 had been delayed by technical problems, Vostok 6's launch proceeded with no difficulties. Data collected during the mission provided better understanding of the female body's reaction to spaceflight. Like other cosmonauts on Vostok missions, Tereshkova maintained a flight log, took photographs, and manually oriented the spacecraft. Her photographs of the horizon from space were later used to identify aerosol layers within the atmosphere. The mission, a joint flight with Vostok 5, was originally conceived as being a joint mission with two Vostoks each carrying a female cosmonaut, but this changed as the Vostok program experienced cutbacks as a precursor to the retooling of the program into the Voskhod program. Vostok 6 was the last flight of a Vostok 3KA spacecraft.

At the site, in a small park at the roadside is a statue of Tereshkova, with arms outstretched, at the top of a curved column.

The capsule is now on display at the RKK Energia Museum in Korolyov (near Moscow). From September 2015 it formed part of the content of the "Cosmonauts" exhibition at the Science Museum, London. The Exhibition featured many iconic objects from the Soviet space program.

This was the final Vostok flight.

During flight 
The Soviet state television network broadcast live video of Tereshkova from a camera inside the capsule, and she conversed with Premier Nikita Khrushchev over the radio. Communications with ground controllers about her overall health were described in post-flight reports as "evasive", and later official accounts of the mission had somewhat condescending remarks about Tereshkova's overall in-flight performance.

In Tereshkova's account of the mission in her postflight debriefing, she mentioned having assorted body pains and difficulty with her helmet headset (also reported by Bykovsky on Vostok 5). She vomited while attempting to eat, although she attributed this to the taste of the food rather than her physical condition. Another problem was that while the Soviet space agency had provided her with food, water and tooth paste, they had forgotten to pack a toothbrush.

During landing 
Like all the previous Vostok flights, Tereshkova had to eject.  She landed safely by parachute.

It was revealed in 2004 that an error in the control program made the spaceship ascend from orbit instead of descending. Tereshkova noticed the fault on the first day of the flight and reported it to spacecraft designer Sergey Korolev. Flight controllers then provided Tereshkova with data to enter into the descent program. By request of Korolev, Tereshkova kept the problem secret. "I kept silent, but Evgeny Vasilievich decided to make it public. So, I can easily talk about it now."

Pilot
Prime: Valentina Tereshkova – only spaceflight

Backup pilot: Irina Solovyova

Reserve pilot: Valentina Ponomaryova

Mission parameters

 Mass: 
 Apogee: 
 Perigee: 
 Inclination: 64.9°
 Period: 87.8 minutes

References

Spacecraft launched in 1963
1963 in the Soviet Union
Valentina Tereshkova
Human spaceflights
Vostok program
Spacecraft which reentered in 1963
June 1963 events